Barongia is a genus of flowering plants in the myrtle family, Myrtaceae first described as a genus in 1988. It contains only one known species, Barongia lophandra, endemic to the Cook region of Queensland, Australia.

References

Myrtaceae
Monotypic Myrtaceae genera
Myrtales of Australia
Endemic flora of Queensland
Taxa named by Bernard Hyland
Taxa named by Paul G. Wilson